Abraham Charnes (September 4, 1917 – December 19, 1992) was an American mathematician who worked in the area of operations research. Charnes published more than 200 research articles and seven books, including An Introduction to Linear Programming. His works influenced the development of Data envelopment analysis (DEA) method.

Charnes received his bachelor's degree in 1938, master's degree in 1939, and PhD degree (with a thesis entitled Wing-Body Interaction in Linear Supersonic Flow) in 1947 from the University of Illinois. Charnes taught at the Carnegie Institute of Technology, Purdue University, Northwestern University, and at the University of Texas at Austin since 1968.

In 1975 Charnes was shortlisted for the Nobel Prize in economics. In 1982 he was awarded (jointly with William W. Cooper and Richard Duffin) the John von Neumann Theory Prize. In 1989 he received the Harold Larnder Prize of the Canadian Operations Research Society. In 2006 he received (jointly with William W. Cooper) the INFORMS Impact Prize. Charnes also received the Distinguished Public Service medal from the U.S. Navy for his contributions as a research physicist and operations analyst during World War II.

See also

 Chance-constrained portfolio selection

References

External links
 
 Biography of Abraham Charnes from the Institute for Operations Research and the Management Sciences (INFORMS)

20th-century American mathematicians
1917 births
John von Neumann Theory Prize winners
1992 deaths
Fellows of the Econometric Society